The Iran Central Bar Association (Kānun-e Vokalā-ye Dādgostari-ye Markaz) is the central bar association of Iran, located in Tehran. It is the largest bar association in Iran, with responsibility for the central province along with six others. Its membership consists of over 20,000 lawyers. Since 1968, it is a member of the International Bar Association. Like the other 15 regional bar associations in Iran, the Central Bar Association is overseen by the Iran Bar Associations Union.

History
The Iran Bar Association was originally founded in 1915 under the supervision of the country's judiciary system. In 1937, Article 18 of the Law of Attorneyship granted the Bar Association "legal personality", thus making it nominally independent, at least on financial issues; however, it still remained subordinate to the Justice Ministry. Full independence would not be achieved until 1953. The Prime Minister at the time, Dr. Mohammad Mosaddeq, himself a lawyer by trade, signed the "Bill of Independence of the Iranian Bar Association" into law on February 26, 1953, a date which the Bar Association has celebrated annually to this day. Under this law, the Bar Association's board of directors was to be chosen without involvement from the Justice Ministry; similarly, it was granted the right to grant and revoke licenses to practice law without interference from the Justice Ministry. Finally, the Bar Association would not receive any funds from the government; rather, the attorneys themselves would pay for its expenses. The Bar Association continued to function in this manner until the Islamic Revolution in 1979.

The new Islamic Republic, with its foundation in Shari'a law, regarded the Bar Association as a source of opposition for their revolutionary agenda. Thus, in 1980, the Law on Purging the Bar Association was passed, shutting down the Bar Association. Most members of its board of directors were arrested and imprisoned, and rank-and-file lawyers who were accused of promoting "subversive" ideas had their legal licenses revoked. In 1984, the Bar Association was reinstated - under supervision of the Justice Ministry - due to international pressure. However, it was effectively shut down again from 1991 until 1997, when the reformist Mohammad Khatami was elected president. However, also in 1997, the Law on Conditions for Obtaining the Attorney's License was passed, substantially tightening the judiciary's control over the election of the Bar Association's board of directors. This had the effect that, when the next Bar Association board election was held in 1998, almost half the candidates were disqualified by the Supreme Disciplinary Court.

Duties
The duties of the Bar Association are as follows:

 Granting licenses to candidates who meet the legal requirements.
 Administration of affairs regarding the representation of the judiciary and supervision of the actions of lawyers and employers.
 Investigation of violations and disciplinary prosecution of lawyers and judicial officials by the prosecutor's office and the disciplinary court of lawyers.
 Judicial assistance
 Provide tools for the scientific and practical advancement of lawyers.

References

External links 
Iran Bar Association

Organizations established in 1915
Legal organizations based in Iran
Bar associations of Asia